Ángel Martín Cofré Romero (born 11 July 1994) is a Chilean former professional footballer who last played for Chilean Tercera A side Deportivo Estación Central as a midfielder.

Club career
He began plays football in the amateur club, Aurora de Chile, in Puente Alto, commune of Santiago Chile. He was transferred to professional football Club Cobreloa in 2008.

He reach the final of the tournament of Campeonato Fútbol Joven 2010 U-16 category with Cobreloa U-16, this because he scored a free kick goal in semi-final match against Palestino U-16 at 35 minutes of this. Cobreloa can't win the final against Colo-Colo U-16 finish in second place.

He made his professional debut in June 2011 with Cobreloa, in the Cobreloa vs. Deportes Iquique match, valid for local Cup, Copa Chile 2011.

He won the tournament Campeonato ANFP Fútbol Joven Sub-19 2014 for Cobreloa U-19, in the final he plays against Universidad de Chile U-19, entering as headline, Cobreloa won by 3 - 0. This title earned him eligible to play the Supercopa Against Colo-Colo, however he just can take the second place.

He was sent on loan to C.D. Colchagua to plays in Segunda División de Chile for the 2015–16 season. In this club he can disputed 24 matches and scored 4 goals. Then he returned to Cobreloa to play 2016–17 season in Primera B de Chile.

On 2017, after ending his contract with Cobreloa, he signed with Deportivo Estación Central in the Tercera A, the fourth level of the Chilean football.

International career
He was called to the national U-15 team, requested by former Chile U-15 coach, to play in the tournament 2009 South American Under-15 Football Championship. He was nominated as forward.

He participated in the tournament, Torneo Internacional UC Sub-17 2010, scored a goal in Chile U-17 vs. Audax Italiano U-16 match, valid for the seventh place of the tournament.

Career statistics

Club

Honours
Cobreloa U19
 Campeonato ANFP Fútbol Joven Sub-19: 2014

References

External links
 
 Ángel Cofré at playmakerstats.com (English version of ceroacero.es)
 Ángel Cofré at Soccerpunter

1994 births
Living people
Footballers from Santiago
Chilean footballers
Chile youth international footballers
Cobreloa footballers
Deportes Colchagua footballers
Chilean Primera División players
Primera B de Chile players
Segunda División Profesional de Chile players
Association football midfielders